Hugues III (died 1110), Viscount of Châteaudun, son of Rotrou I, Viscount of Châteaudun, and Adelise de Bellême, daughter of Guérin de Domfront. Hughes became Viscount of Châteaudun upon his father's death in 1080.

Hughes donated the church of Saint-Léonard de Bellême to Marmoutier Abbey in 1092, and in 1096, Pope Urban II consecrated the new chapel and preached for the First Crusade.

Hughes married Agnes, Comtesse de Fréteval, daughter of Foucher, Seigneur de Fréteval, and Hildeburge Goët. Hughes and Agnes had three children:
 Mathilde (d. 25 September 1139), married firstly Robert, Viscount of Blois, and secondly Goeffroy III “Grisegonelle” Count of Vendôme, son of Geoffroy II (Jordan), Seigneur de Preuilly, and Euphrosine de Vendôme.
 Geoffrey III, Viscount of Châteaudun
 Fulcois.

Hughes was succeeded as Viscount of Châteaudun by his son Geoffrey upon his death.

Sources 
 Settipani, Christian, Les vicomtes de Châteaudun et leurs alliés, dans Onomastique et Parenté dans l'Occident médiéval, Oxford, Linacre, Unit for Prosopographical Research, 2000
 Tout, T. F., Periods of European History, Volume II: The Empire and the Papacy, 918-1273, Rivingtons, London, 1932
 Bury, J. B. (Editor), The Cambridge Medieval History, Volume V, Contest of Empire and Papacy, Cambridge University Press, 1926
 Runciman, Steven, A History of the Crusades, Volume One, The First Crusade and the Foundation of the Kingdom of Jerusalem, Cambridge University Press, 1951
 Medieval Lands Project, Vicomtes de Châteaudun

Viscounts of Châteaudun

11th-century births
1110 deaths

Year of birth unknown